The Last Rebel is a 1971 American Technicolor Western television film directed by Denys McCoy and starring Joe Namath.

Plot
Set in 1865 in southwest Missouri, at the close of the Civil War the film follows the adventures of two Confederate men and a black man whom they rescue from a lynching.

Cast
 Joe Namath as 'Captain' Hollis 
 Jack Elam as Matt
 Woody Strode as Duncan
 Ty Hardin as The Sheriff
 Victoria George as Pearl
 Renato Romano as Deputy Virgil
 Marina Coffa as Camelia
 Annamaria Chio as Madam Dupres
 Mike Forrest as Cowboy
 Bruce Eweka as The Black Boy
 Jessica Dublin as Ruby, Pearl's partner
 Larry Laurence as Bedroom Man
 Sebastian Segriff as Union Officer
 Al Hassan as Al the Badman
 Art Johnson as Tall Soldier
 Paul Sheriff as Old Soldier
 Troy Patterson as 1st Rancher 
 Rick Wells as 2nd Rancher
 Dominic Barto as Stagecoach Agent
 James Garbo as Deputy 
 Tomas Rudy as Deputy

References

External links
 
 The Last Rebel at TCMDB
 Review of film at New York Times

1971 television films
1971 Western (genre) films
American Western (genre) television films
Columbia Pictures films
Films with screenplays by Warren Kiefer
Films set in 1865
Films set in Missouri
American Civil War films
1970s English-language films
1970s American films